The Coolidge Homestead, also known as Calvin Coolidge Homestead District or President Calvin Coolidge State Historic Site, was the childhood home of the 30th president of the United States, Calvin Coolidge and the place where he first took the presidential oath of office. Located in Plymouth Notch, Vermont, Coolidge lived there from age four in 1876 to 1887, when he departed for Black River Academy for education. He is buried in Plymouth Notch Cemetery not far from the home.

History

The home was bought by his father, John Coolidge, who expanded it from a simple -story farm house to its present size and appearance today.

Despite living most of his life in Northampton, Massachusetts, Calvin Coolidge often returned to the homestead to visit his family, and he was staying there when President Warren G. Harding died. Coolidge was sworn in by his father in the family parlor after taking the Oath of Office for the presidency. Due to his father's refusal to modernize the house it remains in the same condition, and in some cases with the same furnishings, as it was the night Coolidge took the oath. The Inaugural Room itself is behind glass, but a visitor can stand in an alcove and see the lamp, Bible, and table that were used in the ceremony, all placed in their historic positions.

The Homestead District includes:
A Visitors Center
Coolidge Homestead
Farmer's Museum
Wilder House
Wilder Horse Barn
Old Coolidge Farmhouse/Florence Ciley General Store/Coolidge Hall
Coolidge Farm Shop
Plymouth Cheese Factory (cheese making museum upstairs)
One-Room Schoolhouse
Azro Johnson House
Union Christian Church
Carrie Brown Coolidge Garden (begun by the President's stepmother)
Aldrich House
Top of the Notch Cabins (1927 tourist accommodations)
Brown Family Farmhouse
Plymouth Notch Cemetery

The district was declared a National Historic Landmark in 1965.

Today, the Coolidge Homestead is part of the Calvin Coolidge State Historical Site overseen by the state of Vermont.  As far as possible the buildings have been returned to the conditions they were in when Coolidge was president.  A simple video and picture display of his life is shown in the barn.  The rooms in Coolidge Hall that he used as a Summer White House in 1924 have been restored and a video of contemporary newsreel film added.

It is located west and north of Vermont Route 100A in Plymouth Notch, and open daily from 9:30 A.M. to 5:00 P.M, late May to mid-October. Four generations of the family, including the President, are buried in nearby Plymouth Notch Cemetery. The Calvin Coolidge State Park, a developed part of the Coolidge State Forest, is also close by.

Images

Coolidge Hall

Wilder Barn

Wilder Horse Barn Exhibits

See also
Calvin Coolidge House, Northampton, Massachusetts
List of residences of presidents of the United States
List of National Historic Landmarks in Vermont
National Register of Historic Places listings in Windsor County, Vermont
Presidential memorials in the United States

References

External links
National Park Service site on the Coolidge Homestead
President Calvin Coolidge State Historic Site - official website
"Life Portrait of Calvin Coolidge", from C-SPAN's American Presidents: Life Portraits, broadcast from the Coolidge Homestead, September 27, 1999

Vermont State Historic Sites
Presidential homes in the United States
Vermont culture
National Historic Landmarks in Vermont
Organizations based in Vermont
Houses completed in 1872
Historic house museums in Vermont
Museums in Windsor County, Vermont
Houses on the National Register of Historic Places in Vermont
Biographical museums in Vermont
Presidential museums in the United States
Houses in Windsor County, Vermont
Coolidge family
Calvin Coolidge
Historic districts on the National Register of Historic Places in Vermont
National Register of Historic Places in Windsor County, Vermont
1872 establishments in Vermont